The Sonora Pilots are a professional independent baseball team based in Yuma, Arizona and represent Sonora, Mexico.  They play in the International Division of the developmental Arizona Winter League, a short-season instructional winter league sanctioned by the North American League and they play their home games at Desert Sun Stadium in Yuma, along with the Canada Miners, San Diego Surf Dawgs and Yuma Scorpions.  They are not affiliated with Major League Baseball or Minor League Baseball.

Team history
The team started as the Snow Falcons and they used the logo and uniforms of the inactive Surprise Fightin' Falcons team of the now-defunct Golden Baseball League.  They were initially managed by Benny Castillo during their original 2-year AWL run.  The team did not return after two seasons in November 2008 and were replaced by Team Canada.

On July 10, 2009, they were announced as set to play in 2010 in the Arizona Winter League, again playing at Desert Sun Stadium.  However, an October 23, 2009, update does not have them coming back to the AWL after all.  They could be invited to play in another league in the future.  On January 5, 2011, they were announced to be returning to play in the International Division for the 2011 season.

Season-by-season records
Arizona Winter League:

See also
 Surprise Fightin' Falcons

Reference Links

External links
 Arizona Winter League's official website
 Golden Baseball League

Arizona Winter League teams
Professional baseball teams in Arizona